Agha Shahzaib Durrani is a Pakistani politician who has been a member of Senate of Pakistan since July 2017.

Political career
He was elected to the Senate of Pakistan as a candidate of Pakistan Muslim League (N) on a seat reserved for technocrats from Balochistan in July 2017, replacing Agha Shahbaz Khan Durrani.

References

Living people
Pakistani senators (14th Parliament)
Pakistan Muslim League (N) politicians
Year of birth missing (living people)